Bebearia juno is a butterfly in the family Nymphalidae. It is found in the Democratic Republic of the Congo, the Central African Republic and Cameroon.

References

Butterflies described in 1990
juno